The D Line is one of seven RapidRide lines (routes with some bus rapid transit features) operated by King County Metro in King County, Washington. The D Line began service on September 29, 2012, running between Carkeek Park in Crown Hill, Ballard, Interbay and Uptown and downtown Seattle. The line runs via Holman Road NW, 15th Ave NW, 15th Ave W, Elliott Ave W, W Mercer Pl, Queen Anne Ave N/1st Ave N and 3rd Ave.

Prior to March 2016, the D Line was through-routed with the C Line, with buses continuing to West Seattle from Downtown.

History
This corridor was previously served Metro routes 15 and 18. which carried a combined average of 7,630 riders on weekdays during the last month in service. Since the implementation of RapidRide on the corridor, ridership has grown 53 percent and the D Line served an average of 11,700 riders on weekdays in spring 2015.

Service

Later developments
The city of Seattle made major improvements to the RapidRide C and D lines after their opening with funds generated by Proposition 1 (which increased sales tax by 0.1 percent and imposes a $60 annual car-tab fee).

The first improvements came in June 2015 when headways on the RapidRide C and D lines were decreased. Buses will arrive every 7–8 minutes during weekday rush hour, every 12 minutes during the midday hours on weekdays, every 12 minutes during the daytime on Saturday and every 15 minutes on Sunday and during weekday and weekend nights.

In March 2016, the city split the previously interlined RapidRide C and D lines apart after the successful passage of additional funding for the two routes. C Line buses now continue north through parts of Belltown and onto Westlake Avenue in the South Lake Union neighborhood, terminating on Valley Street near the Fred Hutchinson Cancer Research Center campus. D Line buses instead continue south on 3rd Avenue into Pioneer Square, using layover space on 5th Avenue south of Terrace Street.

References

External links
D Line website

Bus transportation in Washington (state)
Transportation in King County, Washington
Transportation in Seattle
2012 establishments in Washington (state)
2012 in transport
King County Metro